= United States capital (disambiguation) =

The capital of the United States is Washington, D.C.

United States capital may also refer to:

- A misspelling of United States Capitol, the building that houses the legislative branch of the United States government
- Any city on the list of capitals in the United States, including state, territorial, and former national capitals
